The Choco manakin (Cryptopipo litae) is a species of bird in the family Pipridae. It occurs in humid forest in lowlands and foothills. It is found in the humid Chocó in eastern Panama, western Colombia and northwestern Ecuador.  It is considered to be of least concern by BirdLife International and IUCN.

References

Cryptopipo
Birds of the Tumbes-Chocó-Magdalena
Birds described in 1906
Taxa named by Carl Eduard Hellmayr